An orthography is a set of conventions for writing a language, including norms of spelling, hyphenation, capitalization, word breaks, emphasis, and punctuation.

Most transnational languages in the modern period have a writing system, and most of these systems have undergone substantial standardization, thus exhibiting less dialect variation than the spoken language. These processes can fossilize pronunciation patterns that are no longer routinely observed in speech (e.g., "would" and "should"); they can also reflect deliberate efforts to introduce variability for the sake of national identity, as seen in Noah Webster's efforts to introduce easily noticeable differences between American and British spelling (e.g., "honor" and "honour"). 

Some nations (e.g. France and Spain) have established language academies in an attempt to regulate orthography officially. For most languages (including English) however, there are no such authorities and a sense of 'correct' orthography evolves through encounters with print in schooling, workplace, and informal contexts. Some organizations, however, such as newspapers of record or academic journals, opt for greater orthographic homogeneity by enforcing a particular style guide.

Etymology and meaning 
The English word orthography dates from the 15th century.

Orthography is largely concerned with matters of spelling, and in particular the relationship between phonemes and graphemes in a language. Other elements that may be considered part of orthography include hyphenation, capitalization, word breaks, emphasis, and punctuation. Orthography thus describes or defines the set of symbols used in writing a language and the conventions that broadly regulate their use.

Most natural languages developed as oral languages, and writing systems have usually been crafted or adapted as ways of representing the spoken language. The rules for doing this tend to become standardized for a given language, leading to the development of an orthography that is generally considered "correct". In linguistics, the term orthography is often used to refer to any method of writing a language, without judgment as to right and wrong, with a scientific understanding that orthographic standardization exists on a spectrum of strength of convention. The original sense of the word, though, implies a dichotomy of correct and incorrect, and the word is still most often used to refer specifically to a thoroughly standardized, prescriptively correct, way of writing a language. A distinction may be made here between etic and emic viewpoints: the purely descriptive (etic) approach, which simply considers any system that is actually used—and the emic view, which takes account of language users' perceptions of correctness.

Units and notation

Orthographic units, such as letters of an alphabet, are technically called graphemes. These are a type of abstraction, analogous to the phonemes of spoken languages; different physical forms of written symbols are considered to represent the same grapheme if the differences between them are not significant for meaning. Thus, a grapheme can be regarded as an abstraction of a collection of glyphs that are all functionally equivalent. Since, however, the substitution of either of them for the other cannot change the meaning of a word, they are considered to be allographs of the same grapheme, which can be written . The italic and bold face forms are also allographic.
 
This distinguishes them from phonemic transcription, which is placed between slashes, and from phonetic transcription, which is placed between square brackets.

Types 
The writing systems on which orthographies are based can be divided into a number of types, depending on what type of unit each symbol serves to represent. The principal types are logographic (with symbols representing words or morphemes), syllabic (with symbols representing syllables), and alphabetic (with symbols roughly representing phonemes). Many writing systems combine features of more than one of these types, and a number of detailed classifications have been proposed. Japanese is an example of a writing system that can be written using a combination of logographic kanji characters and syllabic hiragana and katakana characters; as with many non-alphabetic languages, alphabetic romaji characters may also be used as needed.

Correspondence with pronunciation
Orthographies that use alphabets and syllabaries are based on the principle that the written symbols (graphemes) correspond to units of sound of the spoken language: phonemes in the former case, and syllables in the latter. However, in virtually all cases, this correspondence is not exact. Different languages' orthographies offer different degrees of correspondence between spelling and pronunciation. English orthography, French orthography and Danish orthography, for example, are highly irregular, whereas the orthographies of languages such as Russian, German and Spanish represent pronunciation much more faithfully, although the correspondence between letters and phonemes is still not exact. Finnish, Turkish and Serbo-Croatian orthographies more consistently approximate the principle "one letter per sound."

An orthography in which the correspondences between spelling and pronunciation are highly complex or inconsistent is called a deep orthography (or less formally, the language is said to have irregular spelling). An orthography with relatively simple and consistent correspondences is called shallow (and the language has regular spelling).

One of the main reasons why spelling and pronunciation diverge is that sound changes taking place in the spoken language are not always reflected in the orthography, and hence spellings correspond to historical rather than present-day pronunciation. One consequence of this is that many spellings come to reflect a word's morphophonemic structure rather than its purely phonemic structure (for example, the English regular past tense morpheme is consistently spelled -ed in spite of its different pronunciations in various words).

The syllabary systems of Japanese (hiragana and katakana) are examples of almost perfectly shallow orthographies—the kana correspond with almost perfect consistency to the spoken syllables, although with a few exceptions where symbols reflect historical or morphophonemic features: notably the use of ぢ ji and づ zu (rather than じ ji and ず zu, their pronunciation in standard Tokyo dialect) when the character is a voicing of an underlying ち or つ (see rendaku), and the use of は, を, and へ to represent the sounds わ, お, and え, as relics of historical kana usage.

The Korean hangul system was also originally an extremely shallow orthography, but as a representation of the modern language it frequently also reflects morphophonemic features.

For full discussion of degrees of correspondence between spelling and pronunciation in alphabetic orthographies, including reasons why such correspondence may break down, see Phonemic orthography.

Defective orthographies
An orthography based on the principle that symbols correspond to phonemes may, in some cases, lack characters to represent all the phonemes or all the phonemic distinctions in the language. This is called a defective orthography. An example in English is the lack of any indication of stress. Another is the digraph th, which represents two different phonemes (as in then and thin) and replaced the old letters ð and þ. A more systematic example is that of abjads like the Arabic and Hebrew alphabets, in which the short vowels are normally left unwritten and must be inferred by the reader.

When an alphabet is borrowed from its original language for use with a new language—as has been done with the Latin alphabet for many languages, or Japanese Katakana for non-Japanese words—it often proves defective in representing the new language's phonemes. Sometimes this problem is addressed by the use of such devices as digraphs (such as sh and ch in English, where pairs of letters represent single sounds), diacritics (like the caron on the letters š and č, which represent those same sounds in Czech), or the addition of completely new symbols (as some languages have introduced the letter w to the Latin alphabet) or of symbols from another alphabet, such as the rune þ in Icelandic.

After the classical period, Greek developed a lowercase letter system that introduced diacritic marks to enable foreigners to learn pronunciation and in some cases, grammatical features. However, as pronunciation of letters changed over time, the diacritic marks were reduced to representing the stressed syllable. In Modern Greek typesetting, this system has been simplified to only have a single accent to indicate which syllable is stressed.

See also

 Cursive
 Grapheme
 Keyboard layout
 Lateral masking
 Leet
 List of language disorders
 Palaeography
 Penmanship
 Prescription and description
 Romanization
 Writing
 Writing system

References

Further reading

Smalley, W. A. (ed.) 1964. Orthography studies: articles on new writing systems (United Bible Society, London).

External links

Videos: The History and Impact of Writing in the West
Phonemic awareness page of the CTER wiki
lonestar.texas.net/~jebbo/learn-as/ orthography of Old English

 
Applied linguistics
Language
Linguistics terminology